The azure kingfisher (Ceyx azureus) is a small kingfisher in the river kingfisher subfamily, Alcedininae.

Description
It is a very colourful bird, with deep blue to azure back, a large white to buff spot on the side of the neck and throat, rufous-buff with some blue-violet streaks on the breast and flanks. The feet are red with only two forward toes. The lores (the region between the eye and the bill) are white and inconspicuous except in front view, where they stand out as two large white eye-like spots which may have a role in warding off potential predators.

Taxonomy
The subspecies (see box at right) differ only in minor details: compared with the nominate subspecies Ceyx azureus azureus, C. a. ruficollaris is smaller, brighter, and has more blue on the flanks; C. a. diemenensis is rather large, short-billed, and has a distinctly darker crown; C. a. lessoni is more contrasting, with little blue on the flanks; C.a. affinis has a red billtip, as has the smaller C.a. yamdenae; and C. a. ochrogaster is very pale below. Still, there is very little intergradation in the areas where subspecies meet.  Comparing subspecific variation with climate data, the former's pattern does not follow and in some instances runs contrary to Bergmann's Rule and Gloger's Rule.

The specific epithet is Mediaeval Latin azureus, 'azure'.

Distribution and habitat
The azure kingfisher is found in northern and eastern Australia and Tasmania, as well as the lowlands of New Guinea and neighbouring islands, and out to North Maluku and Romang.
The contact zone between the mainland Australian subspecies is along the east coast of Far North Queensland, between Cairns and Princess Charlotte Bay, and that of the New Guinea ones between Simbu Province and the northern Huon Peninsula, as well as south of Cenderawasih Bay.

The habitat of the azure kingfisher includes the banks of vegetated creeks, lakes, swamps, tidal estuaries, and mangroves.

It is common in the north of its range, tending to uncommon in the south. It is generally sedentary, although some seasonal migration may occur.

Behaviour

Feeding
The azure kingfisher feeds on small fish, crustaceans (such as shrimps, amphipods and freshwater yabbies), water beetles, spiders, locusts, and small frogs or tadpoles. It is often difficult to see until it quickly darts from a perch above water.

Breeding
The breeding season of the azure kingfisher is from September to April in northern Australia and from August to February in southern Australia, sometimes with two broods.
Both parents incubate the eggs for 20–22 days, and then feed the hatchlings for a further 3 to 5 weeks. The nests are occasionally destroyed by floods and their contents may be taken by the brown snake.

Voice
The azure kingfisher is usually silent, but makes a sharp, squeaky call when breeding. Its voice is a high-pitched, shrill "pseet-pseet", often in flight.

Conservation status
Although the population of azure kingfishers is decreasing, their wide distribution enables classification as a species of least concern on the IUCN Red List.

References

Slater, Peter; Slater, Pat & Slater, Raoul (1989): The Slater Field Guide to Australian Birds (Revised Edition). Weldon, Sydney, Chicago.

External links

Photos, audio and video of azure kingfisher from Cornell Lab of Ornithology's Macaulay Library
Photo gallery & description
Photos of azure kingfisher from Graeme Chapman's photo library

azure kingfisher
Birds of the Maluku Islands
Birds of New Guinea
Birds of Australia
azure kingfisher